Hypsipyla albipartalis is a species of snout moth in the genus Hypsipyla. It was described by George Hampson in 1910 and is known from the Democratic Republic of the Congo.

References

Moths described in 1910
Phycitini